Pingi Tala'apitaga (born 24 February 1987) is a Samoan rugby union player who currently plays as a prop for  in the ITM Cup and the  in Super Rugby.

Career

Tala'apitaga debuted for the Bay of Plenty Steamers during the 2010 ITM Cup, however it wasn't until the 2013 season that he really began to establish himself as a regular member of the side.   2014 Tala'apitaga had a strong campaign personally, dominating at scrum time and physical in the loose, he was chased both by the Chiefs and the Highlanders before deciding to sign a Super Rugby contract with the Dunedin-based Highlanders for the 2015 season.

References

1987 births
Samoan rugby union players
Rugby union props
Bay of Plenty rugby union players
Highlanders (rugby union) players
Sportspeople from Apia
Living people